Graytown  may refer to:
Graytown, Ohio, United States
Graytown, Victoria, Australia
Graytown, Wisconsin, United States

See also
Gray town, places in the United States that forbade non-white people after dark
Greytown (disambiguation)